= Sumgait History Museum =

- Sumqayıt Tarix Muzeyi
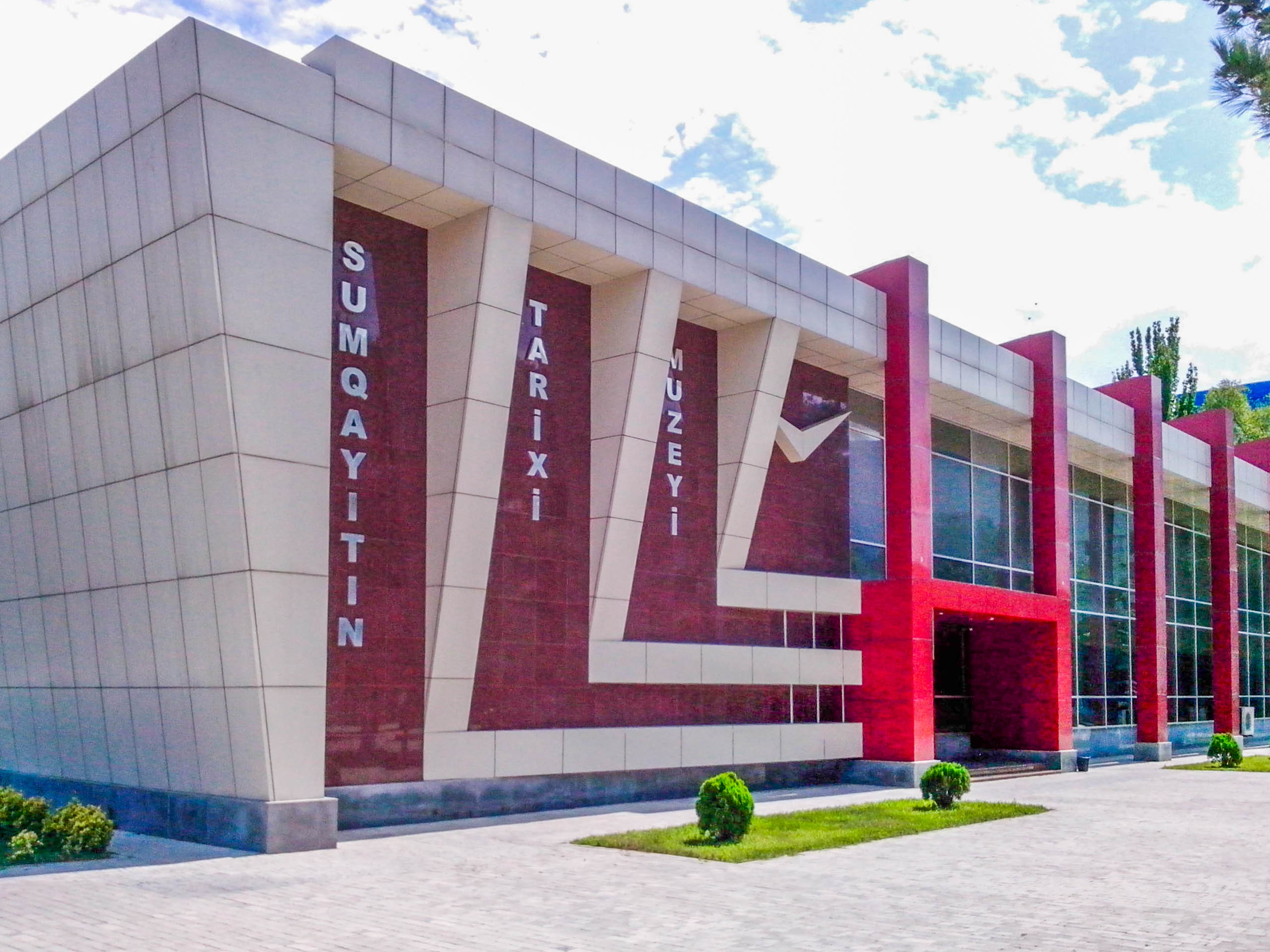
- Building of the museum
- Established: 1967
- Location: Heydar Aliyev Avenue, Sumgait, Azerbaijan
- Coordinates: 40°34′50″N 49°40′41″E
- Type: History museum
- Collection size: 15,000

The Sumgait History Museum is a museum in Sumgait, Azerbaijan. It was established on November 2, 1967. The museum's exhibition is organized chronologically, covering the period from the 16th century to the present. Its main collection contains 15,000 artifacts.

== History ==
Sumgait History Museum began operating in 1967, at the same time as the Sumgait State Art Gallery. It was established by Decree No. 13 of the Council of Ministers of the Azerbaijan SSR on March 13, 1967. On February 17, 1967, by Protocol No. 5, the Sumgait City Executive Committee allocated space for the museum on the first floor of Residential Building No. 132 on S. Vurgun Street, with a total area of 360 square meters. The museum officially opened on November 2, 1967. Initially displaying 150 exhibits, it provided some insight into the city's 18-year history, including developments in industry, education, healthcare, culture, and international relations. Since 1988, the museum has been housed in a separate two-story building. The museum underwent major renovations between 2007 and 2010.

== Building ==
The museum covers a total area of 2,680 square meters. It has 9 halls with an exhibition area of 1,200 square meters and 5 storage rooms totaling 250 square meters. Additionally, there are 6 office rooms, a 50-seat lecture hall, a 165-seat auditorium, and an exhibition hall.

The first-floor exhibition features a bust of Heydar Aliyev, along with documents, photographs, and publications related to his visits to Sumgait. It also includes a monument dedicated to the city's first industrial facility, the Thermal Power Plant, as well as a model of the ancient Silk Road passing through Sumgait and a collection of ceramic and copper vessels.

The second-floor exhibition presents artifacts, photographs, and information on Sumgait's early industrial, educational, healthcare, and cultural institutions. It also includes room models depicting the lifestyle of Jorat village residents and daily life in Sumgait. A section is dedicated to the city's martyrs and National Heroes, along with the Flow of Stars monument.

== Collections ==
The Sumgait History Museum holds over 14,500 artifacts across various sections. The Paleontology section includes fish imprints on stone and petrified wood, indicating the area was once underwater. The Archaeology section contains ceramic fragments and a piece of a wooden bridge from the Sumgait River, mentioned by Alexandre Dumas. The Numismatics section features coins from the 11th to 20th centuries, while the Bonistics section displays historical banknotes. The Ethnographic collection includes household items like embroidered saddlebags and silver belt fragments, reflecting local craftsmanship.
